A retron is a distinct DNA sequence found in the genome of many bacteria species that codes for reverse transcriptase and a unique single-stranded DNA/RNA hybrid called multicopy single-stranded DNA (msDNA). Retron msr RNA is the non-coding RNA produced by retron elements and is the immediate precursor to the synthesis of msDNA. The retron msr RNA folds into a characteristic secondary structure that contains a conserved guanosine residue at the end of a stem loop. Synthesis of DNA by the retron-encoded reverse transcriptase (RT) results in a DNA/RNA chimera which is composed of small single-stranded DNA linked to small single-stranded RNA. The RNA strand is joined to the 5′ end of the DNA chain via a 2′–5′ phosphodiester linkage that occurs from the 2′ position of the conserved internal guanosine residue.

Sequence and structure 
 Retron elements are about 2 kb long. They contain a single operon controlling the synthesis of an RNA transcript carrying three loci, msr, msd, and ret, that are involved in msDNA synthesis. The DNA portion of msDNA is encoded by the msd gene, the RNA portion is encoded by the msr gene, while the product of the ret gene is a reverse transcriptase similar to the RTs produced by retroviruses and other types of retroelements. Like other reverse transcriptases, the retron RT contains seven regions of conserved amino acids (labeled 1–7 in the figure), including a highly conserved tyr-ala-asp-asp (YADD) sequence associated with the catalytic core. The ret gene product is responsible for processing the msd/msr portion of the RNA transcript into msDNA.

Classification and occurrence 
For many years after their discovery in animal viruses, reverse transcriptases were believed to be absent from prokaryotes. Currently, however, RT-encoding elements, i.e. retroelements, have been found in a wide variety of different bacteria: 
Retrons were the first family of retroelement discovered in bacteria; the other two families of known bacterial retroelements are: 
group II introns: Group II introns are the best characterized bacterial retroelement and the only type known to exhibit autonomous mobility; they consist of an RT encoded within a catalytic, self-splicing RNA structure. Group II intron mobility is mediated by a ribonucleoprotein comprising an intron lariat bound to two intron-coded proteins. 
diversity-generating retroelements (DGRs). The  DGRs are not mobile, but function to diversify DNA sequences. For example, DGRs mediate the switch between pathogenic and free-living phases of Bordetella.

Function 
Since retrons are not mobile, their appearance in diverse bacterial species is not a "selfish DNA" phenomenon. Rather, bacterial retrons confer some protection from phage infection to bacterial hosts. Several retrons are located in DNA regions next to certain protein effector-coding genes. When their expression is activated, most of these effectors and their associated retrons function together to block phage infection. 

Retrons are being developed into genome-editing tools.

References

External links
 
 Mystery molecule in bacteria is revealed to be a guard, on: EurekAlert!, 5 Nov 2020. Source: WEIZMANN INSTITUTE OF SCIENCE

Non-coding RNA